Guanoclor (INN), also known as guanochlor, is a sympatholytic drug. It is known to bind to non-adrenergic sites in pig kidney membranes.

Synthesis
When β-(2,6-dichlorophenoxy)ethyl bromide (1) is reacted with hydrazine to give 2, and this is reacted with S-methylthiourea, guanochlor (3) results.

References 

Abandoned drugs
Adrenergic release inhibitors
Antihypertensive agents
Chloroarenes
Guanidines
Phenol ethers